Miroslav Grumić (born 29 June 1984) is a Serbian professional footballer who plays as a forward for Hungarian club Szentlőrinc.

Career
After starting out at Mladost Apatin, Grumić was transferred to Vojvodina in the 2004 winter transfer window. He returned to his mother club the following year. In the summer of 2006, Grumić moved abroad to Ukrainian side Vorskla Poltava. He returned to Serbia and joined Banat Zrenjanin in the 2009 winter transfer window.

In the 2011 winter transfer window, Grumić moved abroad for the second time and joined Hungarian club Kaposvár. He would go on to play for Pécs, Diósgyőr, Kisvárda, Kozármisleny, Szombathelyi Haladás and Zalaegerszeg.

Honours
Diósgyőr
 Ligakupa: 2013–14
Zalaegerszeg
 Nemzeti Bajnokság II: 2018–19

References

External links
 
 
 
 

Association football forwards
1984 births
Living people
People from Apatin
Serbian expatriate footballers
Serbian footballers
Diósgyőri VTK players
FC Vorskla Poltava players
FK Banat Zrenjanin players
FK Mladost Apatin players
FK Vojvodina players
Kaposvári Rákóczi FC players
Kisvárda FC players
Kozármisleny SE footballers
Pécsi MFC players
Szombathelyi Haladás footballers
Zalaegerszegi TE players
Szeged-Csanád Grosics Akadémia footballers
Szentlőrinci SE footballers
Serbian SuperLiga players
First League of Serbia and Montenegro players
Nemzeti Bajnokság I players
Nemzeti Bajnokság II players
Serbian First League players
Ukrainian Premier League players
Serbian expatriate sportspeople in Hungary
Serbian expatriate sportspeople in Ukraine
Expatriate footballers in Hungary
Expatriate footballers in Ukraine